Brachypterolus is a genus of short-winged flower beetles in the family Kateretidae. There are about six described species in Brachypterolus.

Species
These six species belong to the genus Brachypterolus:
 Brachypterolus antirrhini (Murray, 1864)
 Brachypterolus cinereus (Heer, 1841)
 Brachypterolus linariae (Stephens, 1830)
 Brachypterolus longulus (Reitter, 1885)
 Brachypterolus pulicarius (Linnaeus, 1758) (toadflax flower-eating beetle)
 Brachypterolus shimoyamai Hisamatsu, 1985

References

Further reading

External links

 

Kateretidae
Articles created by Qbugbot